In mathematics, Conway polynomial can refer to:

 the Alexander–Conway polynomial in knot theory
 the Conway polynomial (finite fields)
the polynomial of degree 71 that has Conway's constant as its single positive real root